The Message is a religious program broadcast by Philippines-based church, Iglesia ni Cristo and aired over their secular-programming television station, INC-TV. The show uses the English language as its main language, and is produced by the INC Media US bureau. It discuss the religious teachings and beliefs of the Iglesia ni Cristo aimed towards audiences in the United States.

Philippine religious television series
1987 Philippine television series debuts
English-language television shows
ABS-CBN original programming
Intercontinental Broadcasting Corporation original programming